The Delaware Court of Chancery is a court of equity in the American state of Delaware.  It is one of Delaware's three constitutional courts, along with the Supreme Court and Superior Court. Since 2018, the court consists of seven judges. The chief judge is called the Chancellor, and the remaining judges are called Vice Chancellors. The chancellor and vice chancellors are nominated by the governor and confirmed by the state senate for 12-year terms.

Jurisdiction
The Court's jurisdiction is a hybrid of constitutional provisions, statutes, and case law.

According to the Delaware Judicial Information Center

The Court of Chancery has jurisdiction to hear and determine all matters and causes in equity. The general equity jurisdiction of the Court is measured in terms of the general equity jurisdiction of the High Court of Chancery of Great Britain as it existed prior to the separation of the American colonies. The General Assembly may confer upon the Court of Chancery additional statutory jurisdiction. In today's practice, the litigation in the Court of Chancery consists largely of corporate matters, trusts, estates, and other fiduciary matters, disputes involving the purchase and sale of land, questions of title to real estate, and commercial and contractual matters in general. When issues of fact to be tried by a jury arise, the Court of Chancery may order such facts to trial by issues at the Bar of the Superior Court of Delaware. (10 Del. C., 369).

Article IV, Section 10 of the Delaware Constitution establishes the Court and provides that it "shall have all the jurisdiction and powers vested by the laws of this State in the Court of Chancery." The Court has one Chancellor, who is the chief judicial officer of the Court, and four Vice Chancellors.  It also has two Masters in Chancery, who are assigned by the Chancellor and Vice Chancellors to assist in matters as needed.

Equitable jurisdiction
Title 10, Section 341 of the Delaware Code states that the Court "shall have jurisdiction to hear and determine all matters and causes in equity."  Subsequent decisions have held that the Court's equitable jurisdiction is the same as that held by the English High Court of Chancery at the time of American independence in 1776.

The Court's most significant power is its ability to issue preliminary and permanent injunctions and temporary restraining orders.  This is frequently exercised in the context of disputes involving mergers and acquisitions or sales of corporations, wherein a corporate suitor or a shareholder will attempt to enjoin—that is, prevent—the sale or merger of a corporation, claiming that their stock value has been diluted or that they have superior rights to purchase the corporation.  In a typical sale or merger dispute, a plaintiff will seek a temporary restraining order, sometimes on an ex parte basis, to prevent the transaction from taking place and preserve the status quo.  If the Court grants that relief, the plaintiff will then seek a preliminary injunction to maintain the current state of affairs until a trial can take place.

Title 10, Section 342 of the Delaware Code provides that the Court shall not hear any matters for which an adequate remedy exists at law or which can be heard by any other Delaware court.  As a practical matter, this means that the Court cannot grant relief in the form of money damages to compensate a party for a loss or where another court has coterminous jurisdiction.  However, under the rules of equity, the court can grant monetary relief in the form of restitution by ruling that another party has unjustly gained money that belongs to the plaintiff.

Apart from its general equitable jurisdiction, the Court has jurisdiction over a number of other matters.  First, the Court has sole power to appoint guardians of the property and person for mentally or physically disabled Delaware residents.  Similarly, the Court may also appoint guardians for minors, although the Family Court has coterminous jurisdiction over such matters. Will contests and disputes over interpretations of trusts are also heard by the Court.

In 1952, the Court of Chancery held in Gebhart v. Belton that the operation of segregated school systems in Delaware was unlawful, two full years before the U.S. Supreme Court would do so in Brown v. Board of Education.

Procedure
The Court sits without a jury.  All issues of fact are determined by the presiding Chancellor or Vice Chancellor.  The Court has the discretion to appoint an advisory jury if it so desires, but this power is practically never exercised.

History
The history of the Court of Chancery stems back to the English common law system, in which separate courts were established to hear law and equity matters.  English law courts included the Court of King's Bench (or Queen's Bench when the monarch was female), the Court of Common Pleas, and the Court of the Exchequer.  The sole English court of equity was the Court of Chancery.

Along with the remainder of the original Thirteen Colonies, Delaware imported the English concept of common law. This included establishing a separate Court of Chancery.  As the legal system evolved in England, the English Court of Chancery was eventually abolished by the Judicature Act 1873-75 and its powers merged into what was then called 'The Supreme Court of Judicature' (comprising the High Court and the Court of Appeal) which exercised jurisdiction in both common law and equity.  This was prompted in part by similar reforms which had taken place elsewhere, notably the abolition of the New York Court of Chancery in 1847. Most American jurisdictions followed the reforms in New York and England.

In its first Constitution, the Delaware Constitution of 1776, there was no special provision for a court of equity. However, when the constitution was revised in the Delaware Constitution of 1792 a separate Court of Chancery was established. This constitution was heavily influenced by thinking of John Dickinson and George Read. William T. Quillen and Michael Hanrahan in their Short History of the Delaware Court of Chancery repeat the "folklore of the Delaware bench and bar, saying that the impetus for creating a Court of Chancery was to provide a new judicial seat for Delaware's first Chancellor, William Killen." Killen was the elderly and highly respected incumbent Chief Justice of Delaware, and when George Read was considered to be the new Chief Justice of Delaware, he refused unless adequate provisions were made for Killen. A separate Court of Chancery under Killen was the solution.

Constitution of 1792
There was one Chancellor, appointed by the Governor for life.

Constitution of 1831
There was one Chancellor, appointed by the Governor for life.

Constitution of 1897
There is one Chancellor, appointed by the Governor for a 12-year term. There were also created over the years, additional Vice Chancellors, the first in 1939, a second in 1961, a third in 1984, and a fourth in 1989. Since 2018, there are six Vice Chancellors. They are also appointed by the Governor for a 12-year term. They are required to be equally divided between the major political parties, so that among all the Chancellors no party has a majority of more than one person.

The Court also employs two full-time Masters in Chancery, appointed by the Chancellor under Court of Chancery Rule 144. The Masters adjudicate cases assigned to them by the Court, with a particular focus on "the people's concerns in equity," such as guardianships, property disputes, and trust and estate matters. The current Masters in Chancery are Patricia W. Griffin and Selena E. Molina.

See also
 Court of equity
Courts of Delaware
 Delaware corporation
 The Delaware Journal of Corporate Law
 Delaware Corporate and Commercial Litigation Blog

Notes

References

External links
 Delaware Court of Chancery homepage

 
Chancery Court
Courts of equity
1792 establishments in Delaware
Courts and tribunals established in 1792